Subhash C. Kashyap (born 10 May 1929) is a former Secretary-General of 7th Lok Sabha, 8th Lok Sabha and 9th Lok Sabha and Lok Sabha Secretariat (Lower House of Parliament of India) from 1984 to 1990. He is also a well known political scientist, an expert in the Indian Constitution, Constitutional Law, Parliamentary Experts and a distinguished scholar. He also headed an International Centre for Parliamentary Documentation, IPU at Geneva till 1983. Kashyap was Honorary Constitutional Advisor to the Government of India on Panchayati Raj Laws and Institutions. He is also Recipient of several prestigious awards for the  Best Books in Constitution, Law and Political Science. At present Dr. Kashyap is an Honorary Research Professor at the Centre for Policy Research (CPR), New Delhi.
He was also a Member of the National Commission to Review the Working of Constitution and  Chairman of its Drafting and Editorial Committee.

Career
Dr. Kashyap began career at Allahabad as Journalist, Advocate and University Teacher. He became Secretary-General of Lok Sabha on 31 December 1983. He took voluntary retirement in 1990 from the Post of Secretary-General, Lok Sabha and Lok Sabha Secretariat, Parliament of India. Dr. Kashyap had an outstanding academic career with higher education and professional training in India, U.S.A., U.K., and Switzerland.

Position Held
 Patron, Integrated Talent Development Mission (ITDM)
 Honorary Research Professor, Centre for Policy Research (CPR)
 President, Rashtriya Jagriti Sansthan
 President Citizenship Development Society
 Member, Governing Body Auroville Foundation
 Advocate and Consultant, Supreme Court of India
 Member of the India International Centre's Committee of Experts on the Constitution
 Honorary Director of the Project on Constitutional Reforms
 Chairman of the Conferences of Secretaries (1987, 1989)
 Former Director of the institute of Constitutional and Parliamentary Studies on Panchayati Raj laws and institutions.
Chairman, Governing Body, Deshbandhu College (University Of Delhi).

Awards
He was Awarded Honorary title of Commander and degree of H.O.A.S.F. (Honorary Order of the Academy of San Francisco) for services in the field of Constitutional Law. He received Motilal Nehru award two times, and the Coveted Jawaharlal Nehru Fellowship of 1996-98; also received 'Vidur Samman', 'Rajiv Smriti Samman', 'Vidhi Seva Samman' and 'Great Son of the Soil A Award' and many more awards.
Padma Bhushan award in the field of Public Affairs

Published works
Kashyap has published more than 500 research articles and papers, and over 100 books. Some of his books are listed here:
 Framing of India's Constitution -A Study
 Constitution Making Since 1950 -An Overview (1950-2004)
 Blueprint of Political Reforms, CPR, Shipra, New Delhi, 2003.
 The Speaker's Office, Shipra, Delhi, 2001.
 History of the Parliament of India -6 Volumes, (1994-2000)
 Parliamentary Procedure, Law, Privileges, Practice and Precedents -2 volumes
 Institutions of Governance in South Asia, Konark, Delhi, 2000.
 Understanding the Constitution of India, NCERT, New Delhi, 2000
 Citizens and the Constitution (Citizenship values under the Constitution), Publications Division, Ministry of I. & B., Govt. of India, 1997
 Anti-defection Law and Parliamentary Privileges
 Legislative Management Studies, National, Delhi, 1995.
 Our Constitution -Introduction to India's Constitution and Constitutional Law, NBT, New Delhi, 1994
 History of the Freedom Movement
 Delinking Religion and Politics
 Parliamentary Wit and Humour, Shipra, Delhi, 1992.
 The Ten Lok Sabhas, Shipra, Delhi, 1992.
 History of Parliamentary Democracy, Shipra, Delhi, 1991.
 Office of the Speaker and Speakers of Lok Sabha, Shipra, Delhi, 1991.
 The Political System and Institution Building Under Jawaharlal Nehru, National, Delhi, 1990.
 Jawaharlal Nehru, the Constitution and the Parliament
 Our Parliament -An introduction to the Parliament of India, NBT, New Delhi, 1989 (2000 edition). The book is also available in many other Indian languages.
 Parliament of India -Myths and Realities, National, Delhi, 1988.
 Govind Ballath Pant -Parliamentarian, Statesman and Administrator, National, New Delhi, 1988.
 The Ministers and the Legislators, Metropolitan, New Delhi, 1982.
 Jawaharlal Nehru and the Constitution, Metropolitan, 1982.
 Human Rights and Parliament, Metropolitan, New Delhi, 1978.
 Politics of Power, National, Delhi, 1974.
 Tryst with Freedom, National, 1973.
 The Unknown Nietzsche -His socio-political thought and legacy, National, Delhi, 1970.
 Politics of Defection -A Study of State Politics in India, National, Delhi, 1969.
 Our Political System, National Book Trust, 2008.

References

Secretaries General of the Lok Sabha
1929 births
Living people
Politicians from Allahabad
Recipients of the Padma Bhushan in public affairs
Jawaharlal Nehru Fellows
University of Allahabad alumni